Muhammad Leo Michael Toyad bin Abdullah (Jawi: محمد ليو ميکائيل توياد بن عبدالله; born 11 April 1950) is a Malaysian politician. He is the former Member of the Parliament of Malaysia for the Mukah constituency in Sarawak, representing the Parti Pesaka Bumiputera Bersatu (PBB) in the ruling Barisan Nasional (BN) coalition.

Toyad was first elected to Parliament in the 1982 election. In 1987 he became Deputy Minister for Foreign Affairs, and after the 2004 election he joined the full ministry of Prime Minister Abdullah Badawi as Minister for Tourism . He was dropped from the ministry 2006, in a move that surprised observers, to be replaced by Tengku Adnan Tengku Mansor. Ahead of the 2008 election he indicated his intention to retire, but he recontested and won his seat, both in that poll and again in 2013.

Honours

Honours of Malaysia
  :
  Commander of the Order of Loyalty to the Crown of Malaysia (PSM) - Tan Sri (2017)

  :
  Knight Commander of the Order of the Star of Sarawak (PNBS) - Dato' Sri (2006)

References

 

1950 births
Living people
People from Sarawak
Melanau people
Malaysian Muslims
Converts to Islam from Roman Catholicism
Malaysian medical doctors
Parti Pesaka Bumiputera Bersatu politicians
Members of the Dewan Rakyat
Government ministers of Malaysia
Knights Commander of the Most Exalted Order of the Star of Sarawak
Commanders of the Order of Loyalty to the Crown of Malaysia
21st-century Malaysian politicians